The Protestant Church of Westphalia is a United Protestant church body in  North Rhine-Westphalia.

The seat of the praeses (the head of the church) is Bielefeld. The EKvW emerged on 13 June 1945, when the ecclesiastical province of Westphalia within the Lutheran Church of the old-Prussian Union assumed its independence as church body of its own. The EKvW is a full member of the Protestant Church in Germany (EKD), and the Reformed Alliance and is a church whose bases are in a Union between parishes in Lutheran and Calvinistic traditions. The church is also a member of the Community of Protestant Churches in Europe. Präses (president) of the EKvW is Annette Kurschus (2012), as its first female leader.

Präses (President) 
 1834–1835: Jakob von der Kuhlen
 1835–1841: Christian Nonne
 1841–1843: Bernhard Jacobi
 1844–1874: Wilhelm Diedrich Albert
 1874–1902: Ludwig Polscher
 1902–1914: Friedrich König
 1914–1927: Heinrich Kockelke
 1927–1949: Karl Koch (until 1934 Präses der Provinzialsynode, 1934–1945 of Bekenntnissynode, since 1945 of synode)
 1949–1968: Ernst Wilm
 1969–1977: Hans Thimme
 1977–1985: Heinrich Reiß
 1985–1996: Hans-Martin Linnemann
 1996–2004: Manfred Sorg
 2004–2012: Alfred Buß
 2012–: Annette Kurschus

Practices 
The church permits the ordination of women. Blessing of same-sex marriages has been allowed from 2019.

References

External links

 Evangelische Kirche von Westfalen (in German)
 Evangelische Kirche in Deutschland (Evangelical Church in Germany, EKD)
 Evangelical Church of Westphalia, Unionbetweenchristians

Westphalia
Westphalia
Westphalia
Westphalia